Monte Real e Carvide is a civil parish in the municipality of Leiria, Portugal. It was formed in 2013 by the merger of the former parishes Monte Real and Carvide. The population in 2011 was 5,756, in an area of 26.03 km².

References

Parishes of Leiria